Moranbong-guyŏk, or the Moranbong District, is one of the 18 guyŏk which constitute the capital city of Pyongyang, North Korea. It is located north of Chung-guyok, the city's central district, and is bordered to the north by Sosong and Taesong-guyoks, to the east by the Taedong River, and the west by the Pothonggang Canal and Potonggang-guyok. It is named after Moran Hill located in the district's west area ("Moran" is ). It was designated a guyŏk in October 1960 by the Pyongyang City People's Committee.

Overview
A large part of the district is taken up by the Moranbong Park, Pyongyang's largest recreation area, which contains historic relics, including vestiges of the old Pyongyang Castle walls and various ornamental pavilions. The district is also home to the Kim Il-sung Stadium and the site of Kim's first speech after the liberation of Pyongyang on 14 October 1945, called "Every Effort for the Building of a New Democratic Korea". The Pyongyang Arch of Triumph, the world's largest such arch, is also located in the district.

Transport
The Pyongyang Metro runs through this district, with stops at Tongil, Kaeson, Chonu, and Chonsung stations. It is connected to Rungra Island and Taedonggang-guyŏk (on the Taedong's left bank) by the Rungra Bridge.

Administrative divisions
Moranbong-guyok is divided into fifteen administrative districts known as dong. The largest neighborhoods (Inhung, Pipa, and Kinmaul) are further divided in two parts for administrative purposes. Inhung District is the home of North Korea's State Administration of Quality Management.

References

Districts of Pyongyang